Punjab University College of Information Technology (PUCIT) is a college of computer science and information technology at the University of the Punjab located in Lahore, Pakistan. The college is located on the university's Allama Iqbal Campus (Old Campus) in Bahawalpur Block near old Anarkali and PUCIT Quaid-i-Azam Campus (New Campus) is located on Syed Kabeer Ali Shah road, Canal Bank, Lahore. PUCIT is one of the top institutes of computer learning with its degree being awarded 'w' category (Highest) by Higher Education Commission of Pakistan .

History
The college was established with the name Center for Computer Science in 1988. It was situated in the Center for Solid State Physics on the University of the Punjab's new campus. The first program offered was a year-long, two-semester postgraduate diploma for which 24 students were registered. This program was offered until 2000.

In 1991 the Center for Computer Science was upgraded to the Department of Computer Science and for the first time a full-fledged two-year MSc program (annual system) in computer science was offered. The first ever intake for the program was 15 students, which eventually increased to 30.

In December 2000, the department was upgraded to a full-fledged college under the new name of the Punjab University College of Information Technology.

Administration
The Principal is Dr.Shahzad Sarwar.

Academic programs
The following degree programs are offered by the College:
 BS Computer Science.
 BS Information Technology.
 BS Software Engineering.
BS Data Science.
 M.Phil Computer Science. 
 PhD Computer Science.

Student societies
 PUCIT ACM Student Chapter (PASC)
 Sports Society
 Girls Society
 Literary Society
 Event Management Society
 Computer Society
 Drama Society (Pindaal)
 Blood Donor Society

Library
The college has a library consisting of books from Mathematics, Computer Science, Information Technology, Electronics, and Physics. Novels and poetry books are kept in the library for recreation. The library keeps copies of final projects and theses written by graduating students. The Higher Education Commission provides digital access to digital books to students of the college.

Laboratories
The college has four computer laboratories providing students access to the internet. A total of 800 plus computers along with internet facilities are available for the students. For postgraduate students, a separate laboratory is present while an electronics laboratory is made for electronics and physics purposes.

Research labs
The college has four computer laboratories providing students access to the internet. A total of 800 plus computers along with internet facilities are available for the students. For postgraduate students, a separate laboratory is present while an electronics laboratory is made for electronics and physics purposes.

National Center of Artificial Intelligence (NCAI), University of the Punjab 
The National Center of Artificial Intelligence (NCAI), University of the Punjab is funded by Higher Education Commission of Government of Pakistan with a capital cost of PKRS 97.705 million. The NCAI is the latest technological initiative of Government of Pakistan under the government's Vision 2025. The center is designed to become the leading hub of innovation, scientific research, knowledge transfer to the local economy, and training in the area of Artificial Intelligence (AI) and its closely affiliated fields. The central aim is to facilitate the researchers in the field of AI; help them establish and grow AI industry following international trends and seek solutions to the indigenous problems through AI.

For first three years NCAI, University of the Punjab is focused on technologies at the intersection of AI and ICT (AICT) to better understand the transportation phenomena and foster to realize intelligent transportation system (ITS) in Pakistan. Based on the research findings state-of-the-art computational artifacts are being developed to reduce overall life loses on road and the cost of transportation management and planning. The center provides a unique opportunity to determine how existing AICT-based techniques can be utilized to enable these technologies to change society for the better.

Artificial Intelligence and Multidisciplinary (AIM) Research Lab 
Artificial Intelligence and Multidisciplinary (AIM) research laboratory is established in May 2012 to design and utilize cross-disciplinary research tools and techniques for human understanding of such hidden mysteries and craft new artifacts based on research findings for the well-being of humanity. The Lab has secured research funding from various sources including National Information and Communication Technology Research and Development (ICT RnD) fund, Higher Education Commission of Pakistan etc.

Achievements

 2004 ZABVISION - first in the All Pakistan On-spot Programming Competition
 2004 SOFTEC - third in the 9th All Pakistan SOFTEC' 04 - held at NUCES, Lahore
 2006 SOFTEC - Stood 3rd in the All Asia Programming Competition - held at NUCES, Lahore - Team (Fayyaz, Rizwan, and Zaheer) 
2007  - first in the All Asia Programming Competition - held at NUCES, Lahore - Team (Sohaib, Shahzad and others)
 Third in the All Pakistan English debating competition
 A PUCIT student was selected among the top eight speakers in the "Student Convention"
 A PUCIT student was selected among the top three articles writers in a National article writing competition held by The News

References

External links
 Official website
 Student Societies

Universities and colleges in Lahore
Information technology institutes
Computer science institutes in Pakistan
University of the Punjab